This is a list of the extreme points of Serbia: the points that are farther north, south, east, west, higher or lower than any other location.

Latitude and longitude 

 North : Hajdukovo
 South (with Kosovo) : Dragaš 41°52' N
 South (without Kosovo) : Miratovac
 West : Bezdan 18°51'E
 East : Senokos 23°01'E

Altitude 
 Highest point : Velika Rudoka, 2 658 m (with Kosovo)
 Midžor, 2 169 m (without Kosovo)
 Lowest point : Timok River mouth, 28 m

See also 
 Extreme points of Europe
 Extreme points of Earth
 Geography of Serbia

Notes and references
Notes:

References:

Geography of Serbia
Serbia
extreme